Fagnani is an Italian surname. Notable people with the surname include:

 Nina Fagnani (1856–1928), American painter of portrait miniatures
 Prospero Fagnani (died 1678), Italian canon lawyer

Italian-language surnames